Ralph Robert Baker (born August 25, 1942) is a former professional American football player.

Baker was drafted in both the 1964 AFL and NFL drafts—the Pittsburgh Steelers selected him with their 3rd-round pick, while the New York Jets used their 6th-round pick to select him. Baker elected to sign with New York and played linebacker position for 141 games over 11 seasons (1964–1974).  This included the Jets' Super Bowl III victory. In 1979, he was hired as Vice Principal of the Chief Logan High School in Mifflin County, Pennsylvania. This period marked a time of trouble within the rebellious student body and, after one year, both Baker and the school's head principal resigned.  He retired as principal of Tuscarora Junior High School in Mifflintown, Pennsylvania, in 2010.

Baker played college football at Penn State University where he was a member of Sigma Pi fraternity.

See also
 List of American Football League players

References

1942 births
Living people
American football linebackers
New York Jets players
Penn State Nittany Lions football players
People from Lewistown, Pennsylvania
Players of American football from Pennsylvania
American Football League players